The Pune International Film Festival (also known as PIFF) is an annual film festival held in Pune, a city in Maharashtra, India. Open to general public, the films are screened at NFAI, Inox, City Pride, PVR cinema halls, all located in Pune city.

Dr Jabbar Patel is the chairman and director of the festival.

The festival commences on the second Thursday and concludes on the third Thursday of January. First Edition of PIFF was started in year 2002 and has been running annually except for 2004.

Latest PIFF was concluded on 16 January 2020 in its 18th edition. The theme of year was '60 Years of Foundation of Maharashtra'. It celebrated the centenary year of legends - Federico Fellini, Kaifi Azmi, Majrooh Sultanpuri, Shamshad Begum, and Pandit Ravi Shankar. It also paid tribute to late Dr Sriram Lagoo.

Festival categories 

World Competition - Films released in earlier year compete for much-coveted 'Prabhat Best International Film Award'
Marathi Competition - Marathi films released in earlier year compete for 'Sant Tukaram Best International Marathi Film Award'
Student Section - Short films from film schools in India like FTII are screened.
Global Cinema - Non-competition category for cinema around the globe
Country Focus - A handful of films from one country
Theme Section - Films relating to the theme of the festival that year
Retrospective - Retrospective on Indian and Foreign director/actor
Indian Cinema - Offbeat films produced in India (usually excludes Bollywood and other Indian language mainstream films)
Tribute Section - Tribute to film personalities passed that year
Special Screening
PIFF Workshops - Talks, Seminars, and Workshops on varied subjects by Film Industry persons.
Student Animation Section - Short animation films for competition by students.This section was for few years.

Awards 
 Government of Maharashtra Prabhat Best International Film
 Government of Maharashtra Prabhat Best International Film Director
 Government of Maharashtra Sant Tukaram Best International Marathi Film

Sant Tukaram Best International Marathi Film Award winners 

Since 2006, the Government of Maharashtra started awarding the best film in the Marathi competition section at the festival. An international jury watches the competing Marathi films to decide the winner. The award is named after the Marathi film Sant Tukaram, the first Indian entry to be screened at the 5th Venice International Film Festival.

Prabhat International Award Winners 
The festival started an International Competition section from 2005. The Government of Maharashtra started awarding the best film and the best director in the International Competition. An international jury panel decides the awards. Select awards are listed below.

PIFF Distinguished Award 
PIFF Distinguished Award for Outstanding Contribution to Indian Cinema.

S.D. Burman PIFF Award

See also 
 Marathi cinema
 Cinema of India
 Film festival

References

External links 
  of PIFF, India

Film festivals in Maharashtra
Marathi cinema
Marathi-language films
Culture of Pune
Tourist attractions in Pune
Events in Pune